The Miss Supertalent of the World is a twice-yearly global television & media event founded by Thomas Zilliacus and former Regional Head of Nokia Asia Pacific Rim Lawrence Choi which has been held since 2011. Participating are fashion stars of beauty queen, supermodel, actress, pop artists, host, dance champion with unique format showcasing fashion and talent. It was held Paris, Milan, Rome, Cannes, Ferrari museum in Italy, Seoul Notable past contestants include Meriam George, Milett Figueroa, Anna Lundh, Diana Arno, Maria Sten, Dipna Patel, Malina Joshi. Lada Akimova, Bahari Ibaadat...

Supertalent Fashion Week
Supertalent Fashion Week(STOW), is an multi creative fashion event that focuses high quality clients who are valued by collaborators, designers, the media with  model Influencers of Miss Supertalent of the World, it was held at the Eiffel Tower, Galeries Lafayette, Paris, Jungfrau, Schilthorn, Switzerland, Ferrari museum, Modena, Italy. Paris Fashion Week SS23 by STOW 15 was held on 27 Sept 2022 at Pavillon Cambon Capucines, Paris Fashion Week FW23 by STOW 16 was held on 27 February 2023 at Salle Wagram

Supertalent Star Record
Miss Supertalent Organization in collaboration with Challenge Headquarters had launched Supertalent World Record which is world's authority on record-breaking achievements to best global performance ever recorded and officially verified in a specific skills and human achievement of entertainment, sports, politician and 4th industrial entertainment solutions. Psy, Ban Ki-moon, Song Hae, Hong Soo-hwan, Jin Yong, Cho Yong-pil, Park Chan-ho, Lee Seung-yuop, Jang Mi-ran, Cho Yong-pil, Lee Yun-Seo other winners were awarded Supertalent World Record.

Titleholders

Country/Territory by winning the title

Table of Miss Supertalent of the World runner-up and finalists

See also

 Got Talent
 The X Factor
 American Idol
 Elite Model Look
 Ford Models Supermodel of the World
 Miss Universe
 Eurovision Song Contest
 List of beauty contests

References

External links 
 

2011 establishments in South Korea
South Korean reality television series
Beauty pageants in South Korea
Modeling competitions
Fashion events in South Korea
English-language television shows
Entertainment events in South Korea
Talent shows
Competitions
International beauty pageants
Recurring events established in 2011